1. deild karla, known as Lengjudeild karla (The Lengja League) for sponsorship reasons, is a football league in Iceland. It is the second highest professional level in the Icelandic football league system. The league was founded in 1955 and current champions are ÍA.
The league was expanded to 12 teams for the 2007 season, after having only 10 teams for many years. Since 2008 the top three divisions have all had 12 teams.

Current clubs (2022)

History

Championship history

1955 ÍBA (Akureyri)
1956      ÍBH (Hafnarfjörður)
1957 Keflavík (Keflavík)
1958 Þróttur R. (Reykjavík)
1959 ÍBA (Akureyri)
1960      ÍBH (Hafnarfjörður)
1961      ÍBÍ (Ísafjörður)
1962 Keflavík (Keflavík)
1963 Þróttur R. (Reykjavík)
1964 ÍBA (Akureyri)
1965 Þróttur R. (Reykjavík)
1966 Fram (Reykjavík)
1967 ÍBV (Vestmannaeyjar)
1968 ÍA (Akranes)
1969 Víkingur R. (Reykjavík)
1970 Breiðablik (Kópavogur)
1971 Víkingur R. (Reykjavík)
1972 ÍBA (Akureyri)
1973 Víkingur R. (Reykjavík)
1974 FH (Hafnarfjörður)
1975 Breiðablik (Kópavogur)
1976 ÍBV (Vestmannaeyjar)
1977 Þróttur R. (Reykjavík)
1978 KR (Reykjavík)
1979 Breiðablik (Kópavogur)
1980 KA (Akureyri)
1981 Keflavík (Keflavík)
1982 Þróttur R. (Reykjavík)
1983 Fram (Reykjavík)
1984 FH (Hafnarfjörður)
1985 ÍBV (Vestmannaeyjar)
1986 Völsungur (Húsavík)
1987 Víkingur R. (Reykjavík)
1988 FH (Hafnarfjörður)
1989 Stjarnan (Garðabær)
1990 Víðir (Garður)
1991 ÍA (Akranes)
1992 Fylkir (Reykjavík)
1993 Breiðablik (Kópavogur)
1994 Grindavík (Grindavík)
1995 Fylkir (Reykjavík)
1996 Fram (Reykjavík)
1997 Þróttur R. (Reykjavík)
1998 Breiðablik (Kópavogur)
1999 Fylkir (Reykjavík)
2000 FH (Hafnarfjörður)
2001 Þór (Akureyri)
2002 Valur (Reykjavík)
2003 Keflavík (Reykjanesbær)
2004 Valur (Reykjavík)
2005 Breiðablik (Kópavogur)
2006 Fram (Reykjavík)
2007 Grindavík (Grindavík)
2008 ÍBV (Vestmannaeyjar)
2009 Selfoss (Selfoss)
2010 Víkingur R. (Reykjavík)
2011 ÍA (Akranes)
2012 Þór (Akureyri)
2013 Fjölnir (Reykjavík)
2014 Leiknir R. (Reykjavík)
2015 Víkingur Ó. (Ólafsvík)
2016 KA (Akureyri)
2017 Fylkir (Reykjavík)
2018 ÍA (Akranes)
2019 Grótta (Seltjarnarnes)
2020 Keflavík (Reykjanesbær)
2021 Fram (Reykjavík)
2022 Fylkir (Reykjavík)

Number of titles by club

External links
 Icelandic FA 
  League321.com – Icelandic football league tables, records & statistics database. 
  IcelandFootball.net – List of Second Level Champions. 
 SOCCERWAY – 1.deild summary

 
2
Ice
Professional sports leagues in Iceland